The Mekons are a British band formed in the late 1970s as an art collective. They are one of the longest-running and most prolific of the first-wave British punk rock bands.

The band's style has evolved over time to incorporate aspects of country music, folk music, alternative rock and occasional experiments with dub. They are known for their raucous live shows.

History 
The band was formed in 1976 by a group of University of Leeds art students: Jon Langford, Kevin Lycett, Mark White, Andy Corrigan and Tom Greenhalgh—the Gang of Four and Delta 5 formed from the same group of students. They took the band's name from the Mekon, an evil, super-intelligent Venusian featured in the British 1950s–1960s comic Dan Dare (printed in the Eagle). The Mekons were described as more chaotic version of the Gang of Four; Lycett stated the band operated on the principle that "anybody could do it ... anybody could get up and join in and instruments could be swapped around; that there'd be no distance between the audience and the band."

By their second show, supporting the Rezillos at the F Club, they were approached with a record deal by Bob Last of Fast Product. The Mekons were first band signed to the label. The band's first single was "Never Been in a Riot", a satirical take on the Clash's White Riot. The release was made Single of the Week in NME. Their second single, "Where Were You?" was released by the end of 1978 and sold out of its 27,500 copies. At this time, Last convinced the band to sign to a larger label—Virgin. The Mekons popularity peaked as they played on the same bill as other "new music" groups like Gang of Four, the Fall, the Human League, and Stiff Little Fingers.

For several years the band played noisy, bare-bones post-punk, releasing singles on a number of labels. The Mekons' first album, The Quality of Mercy Is Not Strnen, was recorded using the Gang of Four's instruments, and due to an error by the Virgin Records art department, featured pictures of the Gang of Four on the back cover. After 1982's The Mekons Story, a compilation of old recordings, the band ceased activity for a while, with Langford forming The Three Johns. Corrigan became a tour manager for many years before founding a company that provides visa and immigration services specialising in the entertainment industry. 

By the mid-1980s (revitalised by the 1984 coal miners' strike) the Mekons had returned as an active group. The band was now augmented by vocalist Sally Timms, violinist Susie Honeyman, ex-Damned member Lu Edmonds, accordionist/vocalist Rico Bell (a.k.a. Eric Bellis), and former The Rumour drummer Steve Goulding. They began to experiment with musical styles derived from traditional English folk (tentatively explored on the English Dancing Master EP prior to the hiatus), and American country music. Fear and Whiskey (1985), The Edge of the World (1986) and The Mekons Honky Tonkin' (1987) exemplified the band's new sound, which built on the innovations of Gram Parsons and blended punk ethos and left wing politics with the minimalist country of Hank Williams. Subsequent albums, such as The Mekons Rock 'n Roll, continued to experiment with diverse instrumentation (notably the fiddle, accordion, slide guitar, and saz).

The Mekons Rock 'n Roll, released by A&M Records in 1989, was the band's first (and only) album to be put out by a major label. It was not a commercial success, reportedly selling only around 23,000 albums in the U.S., but was met with critical acclaim. It was named eighth of the top 10 albums of 1989 in the Village Voice's Pazz & Jop critics poll. In 1991, New York Times critic Jon Pareles called it "one of the best albums of the 1980s."

Just as the Mekons began to grow in critical stature, their relationship with A&M Records became tense, and the Mekons were soon dropped by the label, unable to fulfill their commercial expectations. However, they continued to record at a prolific rate, releasing such notable albums as 1991's Curse of the Mekons, 2000's Journey to the End of the Night, and 2002's OOOH! Natural moved the band to a more folk-flavoured sound. In April 2009 the Mekons returned to the studio to complete a new collection of songs, released in 2011 as Ancient and Modern on Bloodshot Records, and, in a September 2010 interview, Jon Langford revealed that the band would tour the United States in 2011.

In a February 2011 interview, Langford discussed the music documentary about the band, Revenge of the Mekons, directed by Joe Angio. The film premiered in 2013 at the DOC NYC festival with members of the band in attendance.

The band has toured and recorded with a mostly unaltered lineup (Langford, Greenhalgh, Timms, Goulding, Bell, Edmonds, Honeyman, and bassist Sarah Corina) throughout the 1990s and early 21st century, and has a highly devoted following. Sarah Corina left in 2015, and Dave Trumfio, of Chicago and Southern California, replaced Corina on bass.

The Mekons celebrated their 40th anniversary with the "Mekonville" festival near Ipswich, England, with both the current 2017 line-up and the re-united original 1977 lineup performing.  At that festival, Mekonville, a 12-inch "split single" was released, with one new song from each of the two line-ups.  The "current" line-up, still as "The Mekons", also performed several concerts in the UK and elsewhere in Europe in July and August, 2017.  Jon Langford and Tom Greenhalgh are the only members common to both line-ups.

They recorded their 2019 album Deserted in a studio near to Joshua Tree National Park. In an interview, they described how "the rugged landscape informed the highly diverse collection of songs they wrote".

For 2022, The Mekons announced at least one performance in Europe.

Other projects 
Langford has worked as the founder and member of several solo and band projects including The Three Johns, the Waco Brothers, a punk-meets-Johnny Cash-like ensemble, and the Pine Valley Cosmonauts, a project that explores the music of Bob Wills, Johnny Cash and others. Besides his solo albums Langford has released CDs with Richard Buckner, Kevin Coyne, Kat Ex (Katherina Bornefeld) of The Ex, Roger Knox, and The Sadies, in some cases using the Pine Valley Cosmonauts name.

In 2014, some of The Mekons, dubbing themselves the "mini-Mekons", along with Robbie Fulks, went to northern Scotland to perform, sample the local whisky, and write and record an album on the island of Jura, in the studio of world and roots producer Giles Perring, a long-term collaborator with Mekon Susie Honeyman in the band Echo City.  The record, named Jura, was released in November 2015 on Black Friday and is made up of original songs written on the trip, traditional songs, and a new recording of one Mekons song.

Freakons
In 2013, and again in September 2017 and July 2021, Janet Bean and Catherine Irwin of Freakwater joined together with Jon Langford and Sally Timms of the Mekons to be the Freakons, performing original and cover songs about coal mining in Appalachia, England, and Wales, to support the non-profit organization Kentuckians for the Commonwealth.  Each time, the Freakons performed at the Hideout in Chicago, and elsewhere in Wisconsin.  In 2013, they also performed at San Francisco's Hardly Strictly Bluegrass festival.  In 2017, they were accompanied by violinists Jean Cook of New York City and Anna Krippenstapel of Louisville (The Other Years, Joan Shelley, etc.), and, only in Chicago, by Chicago/Louisville guitarist James Elkington (The Horse's Ha, etc.).  In 2021, the same line-up, without Elkington, performed, and they released the live album Freakons, recorded at the 2017 Chicago performances.

Discography

Albums 
 1979: The Quality of Mercy Is Not Strnen (Virgin Records / Blue Plate-Caroline Records)
 1980: The Mekons aka Devils Rats and Piggies a Special Message from Godzilla (Red Rhino Records, Cherry Red Records, Quarterstick Records) – re-released in 1997
 1982:  The Mekons Story (CNT Productions, Sin Record Company/Feel Good All Over, Buried Treasures Records) – re-released in 1986
 1985: Fear and Whiskey (Sin Record Company; re-released in 2002 and 2019, via bandcamp, by Quarterstick Records)
 1986: The Edge of the World (Sin Record Company; re-released in 1996 and 2019, via bandcamp, by Quarterstick Records)
 1987: The Mekons Honky Tonkin' (Sin Record Company, Twin/Tone Records)
 1988: So Good It Hurts (Sin Record Company/Cooking Vinyl, Rough Trade Records Germany)
 1989: The Mekons Rock 'n Roll (A&M Records, Blast First, Rough Trade Records Germany; re-released circa 2001 by Collectors' Choice Music, and circa 2020, via bandcamp)
 1991: The Curse of the Mekons (A&M Records, Blast First, Rough Trade Records Germany; re-released circa 2001 by Collectors' Choice Music)
 1993: I ♥ Mekons (Quarterstick Records/Touch and Go Records, Rough Trade Records Germany)
 1994: Retreat from Memphis (Quarterstick Records, Rough Trade Records Germany)
 1996: Pussy, King of the Pirates with Kathy Acker (Touch and Go Records)
 1996: Mekons United book and CD (Quarterstick Records)
 1998: Me (Quarterstick Records)
 2000: Journey to the End of the Night (Quarterstick Records)
 2002: OOOH! (Out of Our Heads) (Quarterstick Records)
 2004: Punk Rock (Quarterstick Records)
 2007: Natural (Quarterstick Records)
 2011: Ancient and Modern 1911–2011 (Bloodshot Records)
 2015: Jura, by the mini-Mekons with Robbie Fulks (Bloodshot Records)
 2016: Existentialism (Bloodshot Records)
 2018: It Is Twice Blessed, by the Mekons 77 (Slow Things)
 2019: Deserted (Bloodshot Records)
 2020: Exquisite (self released via bandcamp; 2022 vinyl by Glitterbeat Records)

EPs 
 1983: The English Dancing Master (CNT Records, Rough Trade Records)
 1986: Crime and Punishment (Sin Record Company)
 1986: Slightly South of the Border (Sin Record Company)
 1987: Hole In The Ground / Sin City / Prince Of Darkness (Sin Record Company, Cooking Vinyl, Twin/Tone Records)
 1989: The Dream and Lie of... (A&M Records, Blast First)
 1990: F.U.N. '90 (A&M Records, Blast First)
 1990: Greetings Eight (Materiali Sonori, Italy)
 1992: Wicked Midnite/All I Want (Loud Music)
 1993: Millionaire (Quarterstick Records)
 2007: The Brackenrigg EP (download only)

Singles 
 1978: "Never Been In A Riot" b/w "32 Weeks" and "Heart & Soul" − FAST 1 (Fast Product)
 1978: "Where Were You?" b/w "I'll Have To Dance Then (On My Own)" − FAST 7 (Fast Product)
 1979: "Work All Week" b/w "Unknown Wrecks" − VS300 (Virgin Records)
 1980: "Teeth" b/w "Guardian" and "Kill" b/w "Stay Cool" (Virgin Records) – double 7"
 1980: "Snow" b/w "Another One" (Red Rhino Records)
 1981: "This Sporting Life" b/w "Frustration" − CNT1 (CNT Records)
 1982: "This Sporting Life" b/w "Fight the Cuts" − CNT8 (CNT Records)
 1986: "Hello Cruel World" b/w "Alone & Forsaken" − Sin004 (Sin Record Company)
 1988: "Ghosts of American Astronauts" (Sin Record Company, Cooking Vinyl, Twin/Tone Records)
 1990: "Claw" b/w "Crap Rap" with The Ex (Clawfist)
 1990: "Sheffield Park" b/w "Having a Party" (Blast First)
 1990: "Makes No Difference" b/w "Having A Party" (Blast First)
 1995: "Untitled 1" b/w "Untitled 2" − QS31 (Quarterstick Records)
 2017: Mekonville: "How Many Stars Are Out Tonight" b/w "Still Waiting" −  (Sin/Slow)

Compilations 
 1980: Mutant Pop (PVC/Jem), a US reissue of various early Fast Product singles, including the Mekons first 7", Never Been in a Riot b/w 32 Weeks, as well as Where Were You?, both first released in 1978.
 1985: "They Shall Not Pass" CNT Miner's Strike compilation includes "Fight The Cuts" and "This Sporting Life"
 1986: The Mekons Story—re-released in 1993/2008
 1987: Mekons New York (ROIR) – re-released in 1990/2001 as New York: On the Road 86–87
 1989: Original Sin (Rough Trade Records) – Collects together Fear and Whiskey, parts of The English Dancing Master, Crime and Punishment EP, and Slightly South of the Border EPs
 1999: I Have Been to Heaven and Back: Hen's Teeth and other lost fragments of unpopular culture, Vol. 1 (Quarterstick Records)
 1999: Where Were You? Hen's Teeth and other lost fragments of unpopular culture, Vol. 2 (Quarterstick Records)
 2001: Curse of the Mekons/Fun '90— combined reissue (Collectors' Choice Music)
 2004: Heaven & Hell: The Very Best of the Mekons (Cooking Vinyl)
 2011: Me-Tunes (not on label)

Freakons
 2021 Freakons (Fluff & Gravy Records)

Miscellaneous 
 2002: Hello Cruel World: Selected Lyrics [of 125 songs] book, written & illustrated by The Mekons (Verse Chorus Press)
 2016: Existentialism book, including Existentialism CD (Sin Publications/Verse Chorus Press, distributed by Bloodshot Records)

Documentary 
 2013: Revenge of the Mekons directed by Joe Angio

References

External links 

  – official site
  – official site
 Bloodshot Records – The Mekons label site
 The Mekons info at Club Mekon
 The Mekons – Live Music Archive at Internet Archive
 Mekonville – documentary on The Mekons 2017 reunion at YouTube
 Revenge of the Mekons (2013) – film about The Mekons

Punk rock groups from West Yorkshire
Post-punk groups from Leeds
Alternative rock groups from Leeds
Musical groups established in 1976
Cowpunk musical groups
Quarterstick Records artists
Virgin Records artists
Blast First artists
A&M Records artists
Bloodshot Records artists
Westpark Music artists